Angelo Marchi (born February 28, 1950 in Rho) is a retired Italian professional football player.

He played one game in the Serie A in the 1969/70 season for A.C. Milan.

References

1950 births
Living people
People from Rho, Lombardy
Italian footballers
Italy under-21 international footballers
Serie A players
Serie B players
A.C. Milan players
Calcio Lecco 1912 players
Association football forwards
Footballers from Lombardy
Sportspeople from the Metropolitan City of Milan